NEDC may refer to:
National Economic Development Council, a British economic planning body
New European Driving Cycle